Witalis Leporowski (4 April 1907 – 30 August 1978) was a Polish rower. He competed at the 1936 Summer Olympics in Berlin with the men's coxed four where they were eliminated in the semi-final.

References

1907 births
1978 deaths
Polish male rowers
Olympic rowers of Poland
Rowers at the 1936 Summer Olympics
Sportspeople from Poznań
European Rowing Championships medalists